Squalius spurius is a species of freshwater fish in the family Cyprinidae.

It is found in Syria and Turkey.

Its natural habitats are rivers and intermittent rivers.

Its status is insufficiently known.

Sources

Squalius
Fish described in 1843
Taxonomy articles created by Polbot